Seh Panjeh (also known as Sipanja) is a village in Pasakuh Rural District, Zavin District, Kalat County, Razavi Khorasan Province, Iran. At the 2006 census, its population was 33, in 10 families.

References 

Populated places in Kalat County